Rossiomyces is a genus of fungi in the family Laboulbeniaceae. A monotypic genus, it contains the single species Rossiomyces falcatus.

References

External links
Rossiomyces at Index Fungorum

Laboulbeniomycetes
Monotypic Ascomycota genera